Fruhlingslied may refer to

Film
Heidi und Ihre Freunde 1954 German film by Hans Albin also released as 'Frühlingslied' List of Italian films of 1954

Music
Frühlingslied (Mendelssohn), Song without Words, Op. 62 No. 6 in A major 'Spring Song'  
"Frühlingslied", choral work by Carl Maria von Weber
"Frühlingslied", song by Norbert Burgmüller (1810-1836)
"Frühlingslied", song by Alexander Zemlinsky
"Frühlingslied", song by Theodor Kirchner
"Frühlingslied", song by Charles Ives
"Frühlingslied", song by Brahms, to a poem by Geibel
"Frühlingslied", Lieder (Bruckner) 1851 to a text by Heinrich Heine
"Frühlingslied", song by Schumann to a minor poem by a schoolteacher Ferdinand Braun

See also
Spring Song (disambiguation)